Elastic recoil means the rebound of the lungs after having been stretched by inhalation, or rather, the ease with which the lung rebounds. With inhalation, the intrapleural pressure (the pressure within the pleural cavity) of the lungs decreases. Relaxing the diaphragm during expiration allows the lungs to recoil and regain the intrapleural pressure experienced previously at rest. Elastic recoil is inversely related to lung compliance.

This phenomenon occurs because of the elastin in the elastic fibers in the connective tissue of the lungs, and because of the surface tension of the film of fluid that lines the alveoli.  As water molecules pull together, they also pull on the alveolar walls causing the alveoli to recoil and become smaller.  But two factors prevent the lungs from collapsing: surfactant and the intrapleural pressure. Surfactant is a surface-active lipoprotein complex formed by type II alveolar cells. The proteins and lipids that comprise surfactant have both a hydrophilic region and a hydrophobic region. By absorbing to the air-water interface of alveoli with the hydrophilic head groups in the water and the hydrophobic tails facing towards the air, the main lipid component of surfactant, dipalmitoylphosphatidylcholine, reduces surface tension. It also means the rate of shrinking is more regular because of the stability of surface area caused by surfactant.  Pleural pressure is the pressure in the pleural space.  When this pressure is lower than the pressure of alveoli they tend to expand.  This prevents the elastic fibers and outside pressure from crushing the lungs.  It is a homeostatic mechanism.

Notes and references

Respiratory physiology